Totnor is a hamlet in Herefordshire in the parish of How Caple. It lies on the route of the Wye Valley Walk.

Villages in Herefordshire